Shannon McMillan (born December 16, 1960) is a former Republican Idaho State Representative representing District 7 from 2012 to 2016. She also served District 2 in the A seat from 2010-2012.

Early life 
On December 16, 1960, McMillan was born in Waupaca, Wisconsin. McMillan's father is Melvin Guenther, a railroad worker. McMillan's mother is Margaret Guenther, an accountant. McMillan graduated from Mount Baker High School.

Education 
McMillan attended East Kootenay Community College.

Career 
McMillan was defeated for renomination in the Republican primary in 2016 by Priscilla Giddings, who went on to win her seat.
 
On March 30, 2017 McMillan announced her intentions via social media that she planned to run for her seat again in 2018. McMillan again lost renomination to Giddings.

Committee assignments
Agricultural Affairs Committee from 2010 to 2016
Judiciary, Rules, and Administration Committee from 2010 to 2016
State Affairs Committee from 2012 to 2016

Election history

Personal life 
McMillan's husband is Kenneth. They have one child. McMillan and her family live in Silverton, Idaho.

References

External links
 Shannon McMillan at legislature.idaho.gov
 Shannon McMillan at ballotpedia.org
 Financial information (state office) at the National Institute for Money in State Politics

1960 births
Living people
Republican Party members of the Idaho House of Representatives
People from Shoshone County, Idaho
People from Waupaca, Wisconsin
Women state legislators in Idaho
21st-century American politicians
21st-century American women politicians